Federica Sallusto (born 27 November 1961 in Naples, Italy) is an Italian-Swiss biologist and immunologist.
After high school, she studied Biology at Sapienza - University of Rome where she graduated cum laude.

In 1999, Sallusto, alongside David Dombrowicz, was awarded the Pharmacia Allergy Research Foundation Award, which is given annually to researchers under the age of 40 who are working on IgE‐associated disease.

She is currently group leader at the Institute for Research in Biomedicine in Bellinzona, Switzerland and is professor of immunology at the Università della Svizzera italiana since 2017.

Research 
In 2018 a study published in Nature and authored also by her research group highlighted the role in narcolepsy of T lymphocytes which attack the neuron producing hypocretin.

References

External links
 Institute for Research in Biomedicine

1961 births
Living people
Italian biologists
Italian women biologists
Italian microbiologists
Swiss biologists
Swiss microbiologists
Women microbiologists
Italian immunologists
Academic staff of the University of Palermo
Film people from Naples